The Battle of Rajgad (1703-1704) was fought on between the Mughal Empire and the Maratha Empire. Mughal Emperor, Aurangzeb, ordered for Hamiduddin Khan and Tarbiyat Khan to attack the Rajgad fortress once again, which was being held by Santaji Shilimkar. The Mughals devastated the fortress and inflicted massive damage on the Maratha position. Eventually the majority of the fort was captured, but the Marathas surrendered shortly after.

References

Raigarh (1703-1704)
Raigarh (1703-1704)
1703 in India
Raigarh (1703-1704)